Left-Handed Law is a 1937 American Western film directed by Lesley Selander and written by Frances Guihan. It is based on the 1936 novel Left Handed Law by Charles M. Martin. The film stars Buck Jones, Noel Francis, Nina Quartero, Frank LaRue, Lee Shumway, Robert Frazer, Lee Phelps, George Regas and Matty Fain. The film was released on April 1, 1937, by Universal Pictures.

Plot
Wells Fargo sends agent Alamo Bowie in order to stop "One-Shot" Brady and his gang, after following a couple clues, Alamo gets into a showdown with Brady.

Cast       
Buck Jones as Alamo Bowie
Noel Francis as Betty Golden
Nina Quartero as Chiquita 
Frank LaRue as John Golden
Lee Shumway as Pecos Brown
Robert Frazer as Tom Willis
Lee Phelps as Sheriff Joe Grant
George Regas as Sam Logan
Matty Fain as 'One-Shot' Brady
W. E. Lawrence as Henchman 
Charles Le Moyne as Brazos
Harold Hodge as Hank
Silver as Silver

References

External links
 

1937 films
1930s English-language films
American Western (genre) films
1937 Western (genre) films
Universal Pictures films
Films directed by Lesley Selander
American black-and-white films
1930s American films